Janis Margaret (Jan) Pullinger (born 1947) is a former Canadian politician, who was a member of the Legislative Assembly of British Columbia from 1989 to 2001. She was a member of the British Columbia New Democratic Party.

Pullinger was first elected to the Legislative Assembly in a 1989 by-election, succeeding Dave Stupich in the riding of Nanaimo. In what was then a dual-member district, she served alongside Dale Lovick, whom she would later marry. In the 1991 election, the electoral districts were realigned and Pullinger ran in the new riding of Cowichan-Ladysmith, which she represented for two terms until her retirement from politics in 2001, while Lovick continued to represent Nanaimo.

She served in the Executive Council of British Columbia, as Minister of Small Business, Tourism and Culture, Minister of Human Resources, Minister of Community Development, Co-Operatives and Volunteers, and Minister of Social Development and Economic Security.

Electoral record

|-

|NDP
|Jan Pullinger
|align="right"|12,249
|align="right"|49.85%
|align="right"|
|align="right"|$32,625

|-

|}

|-

|NDP
|Jan Pullinger
|align="right"|11,038
|align="right"|48.53%
|align="right"|
|align="right"|$42,602
|-

|}

References

External links
Jan Pullinger at the Legislative Assembly of British Columbia

1947 births
Living people
British Columbia New Democratic Party MLAs
Women government ministers of Canada
Carleton University alumni
Members of the Executive Council of British Columbia
Royal Roads University alumni
Women MLAs in British Columbia
20th-century Canadian politicians
20th-century Canadian women politicians